PCC SE is an international chemicals, logistics and energy corporation. Headquartered in Duisburg, Germany, the PCC Group has more than 3,300 employees worldwide. It comprises some 70 subsidiaries located at 39 sites in 17 countries, with production facilities in Europe, Asia and the United States. The sole shareholder of the group´s parent and holding company PCC SE is Waldemar Preussner, chairman of the administrative board.

History 

In October 1993, Waldemar Preussner and partners established Petro Carbo Chem Rohstoffhandelsgesellschaft mbH (today PCC Trade & Services GmbH), a commodity trading company, in Duisburg. In 1998, PCC AG was formed as a spin-off and in February 2007, converted into a Societas Europaea (SE). In 1998, PCC SE was one of the first medium-sized German companies to start issuing bonds directly, independently of banks. Since then, corporate bonds have formed the main financing instrument of the group holding company.

The PCC group has expanded and diversified through acquisitions and project investments. Particularly in Poland and elsewhere in Central and Eastern Europe, PCC acquired various previously state-owned companies, which it then modernized and expanded. In 2010, PCC completed the takeover of a Polish chemicals producer, known today as PCC Rokita SA, the largest group subsidiary.

PCC SE has placed minority stakes of two Polish chemical companies on the Warsaw Stock Exchange, PCC Rokita SA (initial public offering in 2014) and PCC Exol SA (2012). Logistics company PCC Intermodal S.A. (IPO in 2009) was delisted from the Warsaw Stock Exchange in 2018. As a major divestiture, in 2009, PCC sold its Polish subgroup PCC Logistics to Deutsche Bahn AG (today DB Cargo Polska).

Investments further afield include US specialty surfactants developer PCC Chemax, Inc. Activities are also being pursued in Asia through the acquisition of a total of 50% of Thai polyols and polyurethane producer IRPC Polyol Company Ltd. In Iceland, PCC commissioned, in 2018, a silicon metal production plant at a cost of around US$300 million powered by geothermal energy.

In 2021, PCC generated consolidated revenue of €979.6 million. Earnings before interest and other financial items, taxes, depreciation and amortization (EBITDA) amounted to €197.5 million, and earnings before taxes (EBT) were €91.7 million.

Divisions 
The group annual report for 2021 lists 55 material portfolio companies as affiliated entities of PCC SE, allocated to the four divisions: Chemicals, Logistics, Energy and Holding/Projects.

Chemicals 
Accounting for a share of around 83 percent, the group´s main revenue generator is the Chemicals division and its five segments Polyols, Surfactants, Chlorine, Specialty Chemicals (including Phosphorus derivatives and Alkylphenols), and Consumer Products, which together realized sales in 2021 of €809-1 million. Its production activities are located primarily in Poland. The largest company is PCC Rokita SA, headquartered in Brzeg Dolny. Among its products are polyether polyols, a feedstock used in the manufacture of PU foams for items such as mattresses. It is also a chlorine producer. PCC Exol SA, Brzeg Dolny, is a Polish manufacturer of surfactants. The largest commodity trading company in the group is PCC Trade & Services GmbH.

Logistics 
The Logistics division is dominated by PCC Intermodal S.A., a combined road and rail logistics services provider in Eastern Europe with five wholly owned container transshipment terminals in Poland and Germany. The company operates container block train services between the Polish inland terminals of PCC, seaports located in Germany, and the Benelux countries, among other destinations.

Energy 
The Energy division is engaged both in combined heat and power generation and in renewable energy generation with six small hydropower plants (SHPP) in North Macedonia and Bosnia & Herzegovina.

Holding/Projects 
This division provides group-wide services such as information technology and finance. It also manages major projects such as the construction (2015-2018) of a production plant for silicon metal in Iceland.

Corporate Citizenship 
The company is the name sponsor of the PCC Stadium in Duisburg, the home venue of local soccer teams. PCC SE supports the homeless relief association Gemeinsam gegen Kälte Duisburg e.V., German children's rights organization Deutscher Kinderschutzbund in Duisburg and the Amani Orphans’ Home Mbigili (AOHM), a Tanzanian non-governmental organization that cares for AIDS orphans in the region. Group companies PCC Rokita SA and PCC Exol SA received a silver and a gold medal, respectively, from the international collaborative sustainability platform, EcoVadis, for their reporting on corporate social responsibility. From 2016 to 2019, PCC Rokita SA was included in the Respect Index, the social responsibility index of companies listed on the Warsaw Stock Exchange.

See also 
 List of German companies

References

Chemical companies of Germany
Multinational companies headquartered in Germany
Manufacturing companies based in Duisburg
Logistics companies of Germany
Energy companies of Germany
German brands
1993 establishments in Germany